Batboldyn Baljinnyam (born 8 November 1999) is a Mongolian footballer who plays as a winger for Mongolian Premier League club FC Ulaanbaatar and the Mongolia national team.

Club career
Baljinnyam was signed by Khoromkhon FC of the Mongolian Premier League in 2011. He remained with the team until 2017 when it was relegated to the Mongolian 1st League. He then signed a 3-year contract with FC Ulaanbaatar.

In 2012, Batbold participated in junior camps held by Italian Serie A club AC Milan in the Mongolian capital of Ulaanbaatar. He was one of four players out of over 200 who were invited to participate in the final youth tournament in Milan.

International career
Baljinnyam made his senior international debut on 22 March 2018 in a friendly against Malaysia. He was later named to Mongolia's squad for the First Preliminary Round of the 2019 EAFF E-1 Football Championship. He appeared in all three of the team's matches, scoring three goals and winning the round's Golden Boot award as top goalscorer.

International goals
Score and result list Mongolia's goal tally first.

International career statistics

References

External links
Mongolian Football Federation profile
National Football Teams profile

1999 births
Living people
Mongolian footballers
Association football midfielders
Khoromkhon players
FC Ulaanbaatar players
Mongolia international footballers
Mongolian National Premier League players